Davina may refer to:

Given name 
Davina (R&B singer) (born 1965), American R&B vocalist and musician
Davina Ingrams, 18th Baroness Darcy de Knayth (1938–2008), member of the House of Lords
Davina Kotulski (born 1970), American civil rights activist
Davina Kumari-Baker, 16-year-old English murder victim
Lady Davina Lewis (born 1977), British aristocrat
Davina Duerr (born 1971), American politician
Davina Oriakhi (born 1994), Nigerian-born singer based in London
Davina Whitehouse (1912–2002), English-born actress
Davina Delor (born 1952), French dancer and writer
Davina McCall (born 1967), British television presenter, known for hosting Big Brother UK and The Million Pound Drop
Davina Semo (born 1981), American sculptor

Other uses 
Davina (talk show), a British talk show hosted by Davina McCall
Davina the Dolphin (formerly Dave the Dolphin), a dolphin who resided off the coast in the Folkestone and Hythe area of England